William Orlando Arias Bermúdez (born 27 August 1990) is a Colombian footballer who plays as a goalkeeper for Jedinstvo Bihać.

References

1990 births
Living people
Colombian footballers
Categoría Primera A players
Liga III players
First League of the Federation of Bosnia and Herzegovina players
Association football goalkeepers
Deportes Tolima footballers
ASC Oțelul Galați players
FC Callatis Mangalia players
NK Jedinstvo Bihać players
Águilas Doradas Rionegro players
Colombian expatriate footballers
Expatriate footballers in Romania
Colombian expatriate sportspeople in Romania
Expatriate footballers in Bolivia
Colombian expatriate sportspeople in Bolivia
Footballers from Bogotá